Graham John Anthony (born 9 August 1975) is an English former professional footballer who played as a midfielder for Sheffield United, Swindon Town, Plymouth Argyle and Carlisle United in The Football League.

Career
Born in South Shields, Anthony was a trainee at Sheffield United but failed to make the breakthrough into the first team squad, making only three league appearances as a substitute. After brief spells at Swindon Town and Plymouth Argyle he settled at Carlisle United where he played regularly for three seasons.

He subsequently dropped into non-league football before retiring some time after 2006 to run a guest house in Cumbria.

References

External links

 http://www.thesackrace.com/teams/carlisle-united

Living people
1975 births
Footballers from South Shields
English footballers
Association football defenders
English Football League players
Sheffield United F.C. players
Scarborough F.C. players
Plymouth Argyle F.C. players
Carlisle United F.C. players
Swindon Town F.C. players
Barrow A.F.C. players
Workington A.F.C. players